Legendo Entertainment is a Sweden-based entertainment company, led by CEO Björn Larsson. Founded as Iridon Interactive in 1998, the company adopted its current title in 2004. Until late 2018, Legendo Entertainment was a dedicated video game company, taking on the creation, development and publishing of various third-party titles through external development teams; since 2018, the company has taken on several multimedia projects, including comics, music, and animation.

History 
Drawing inspiration predominantly from folklore, mythology, alternative science, classic novels and historical events, Legendo Entertainment has produced such works as Dracula Twins, which pays homage to classic literary works by Bram Stoker, Three Musketeers: One For All! which is a nod to Alexandre Dumas, as well as the Attack on Pearl Harbor and Pearl Harbor Trilogy series, inspired by the events of World War II. Legendo's most recent game was FCB Pinball (2014), a digital pinball game featuring a football theme.

In late 2018, Legendo Entertainment began to take on various cross-media projects, separating the company into five departments: Legendo Games, Legendo Comics, Legendo Music, Legendo Media, and Legendo Animation. Legendo Comics's first literary release, Wolfwar Saga: Varangian, is a graphic essay written by Vinithor Amal.

In 2019, Legendo Music supervised the release of a three-track EP titled ÞRÍR: Serpents in the Mist by Draugablíkk, described as a "Hunno-Gothic" band in reference to the Huns and Goths. The band's music is inspired by Norse mythology, Scythian warfare, and Vedic folklore. In 2020, Draugablíkk released a full-length debut album entitled NÍU: Blood of the Amali.

Two games are in development at Legendo: Dracula Twins R2: School's Out, the sequel to Dracula Twins, and Winds of Valhalla: Vikings & Varangians, a turn-based tabletop strategy game. Both games are in development for Nintendo Switch, Windows, Xbox One, and Xbox Series X/S.

Legendo Entertainment is also developing its debut animation project, Dracula Twins: Vampire Vacademy, based on the Dracula Twins video games. It is scheduled for release in 2024.

Video games

As Iridon Interactive
1997 – Dink Smallwood (PC)
1998 – Excessive Speed (PC)
1999 – Total Soccer 2000 (PC)
2000 – Akimbo: Kung-Fu Hero (PC)
2001 – Monster Truck Rumble (PC)
2002 – Turbo Turtle Adventure (GBA)
2003 – Monster Truck Fury (Windows 98 and above)
2003 – Moomin and the Lost Rainbow (GBA) (unreleased)
2003 – Pure Pinball (PC)
2004 – Pure Pinball (Xbox)
2004 – Billy Blade and the Temple of Time (PC)
2005 – Heavyweight Thunder (PC)

As Legendo Entertainment
2005 – The Three Musketeers (Windows XP and Windows Vista)
2006 – Dracula Twins (Windows XP and Windows Vista)
2007 – Attack on Pearl Harbor (Windows XP and Windows Vista)
2008 – Becky & Tim: Spooky Spirits (Windows XP and Windows Vista)
2009 – The Three Musketeers: One for all! (WiiWare)
2009 – Spooky Spirits: Puzzle Drop!! (iPhone) (co-developed with Innogiant)
2010 – Pearl Harbor Trilogy - 1941: Red Sun Rising (WiiWare)
2011 – Ghost Mania (WiiWare)
2011 – The Three Musketeers: One for all! (Mac App Store)
2012 – Fortune Winds: Ancient Trader (Windows and Mac App Store)
2014 –  FCB Pinball: The Official Pinball of FC Barcelona (iPhone/iPad)

Upcoming
 Dracula Twins R2: School's Out! (Nintendo Switch, Windows, Xbox One, Xbox Series X/S)
 Winds of Valhalla: Vikings & Varangians (Nintendo Switch, Windows, Xbox One, Xbox Series X/S)

References

External links

Companies based in Stockholm
Swedish companies established in 1998
Video game companies established in 1998
Video game companies of Sweden
Video game development companies